The Lowndes County Courthouse is a historic courthouse building in Hayneville, Alabama.  It has served as the Lowndes County courthouse since 1856.  The Greek Revival-style building is one of only four antebellum courthouses that remain in use in Alabama.  It was added to the National Register of Historic Places on June 24, 1971.

History
The Lowndes County Courthouse was completed in 1856.  It replaced an earlier courthouse, built in 1832, that had been deemed unsafe.  The building was expanded during 1905 remodeling, with two-story wings added to each side, an enclosed front entrance replacing the portico, and a domed cupola added to the center of the roof.  The side wings and enclosed entrance were removed during the 1980s and the portico replaced with a duplicate of the original, at an approximate cost of $1 million.  A new two-story annex was constructed to the rear of the 1856 building.

References

National Register of Historic Places in Lowndes County, Alabama
Government buildings completed in 1856
County courthouses in Alabama
Courthouses on the National Register of Historic Places in Alabama
Greek Revival architecture in Alabama
1856 establishments in Alabama